Leon C. Goodrich (January 2, 1892 – December 1968) was an American architect of Casper, Wyoming.  A number of his works are listed on the National Register of Historic Places.

Biography
Goodrich was born in Fort Collins, Colorado, in 1892, and moved to Wyoming as an infant.  He attended the University of Wyoming and began his architectural career working as a draftsman from 1911 to 1917 for William Dubois in Cheyenne, Wyoming.  He was in partnership with Dubois as Dubois & Goodrich from 1917 to 1930, though he moved to Casper during an oil boom in 1917.  In 1930, Goodrich formed the Casper, Wyoming firm of Goodrich & Krusmark with Karl Louis Krusmark.  In 1949, he formed the Casper, Wyoming firm of Goodrich & Wilking with Jan VanTyne Wilking.

Goodrich was one of four Wyoming architects who received state licensing in 1951 by grandfathering, when the state licensing system was started, and he served as the first Vice President of the state licensing board.  He was also a founding member of the Wyoming Chapter of the American Institute of Architects.

Goodrich is credited with the design of numerous buildings throughout Wyoming from the 1920s through the 1960s.  A number of his works are listed on the National Register of Historic Places.

Works

Works include (with variations in attribution):
Rialto Theatre (1921-1922 remodel), formerly known as the New Lyric Theatre, 102 E. Second St., Casper, Wyoming (Dubois & Goodrich), NRHP-listed
Turner-Cottman Building (1924), Casper, Wyoming, NRHP-listed
St. Anthony School (1927), Casper, Wyoming
Turner-Cottman Building (1924), 120-130 W. Second St., Casper, Wyoming
Paul Stock House (1945-1946), 1300 Sunset Dr, Cody, WY (Goodrich, Leon), NRHP-listed<ref name="nrhpinv1_PaulStockHouse"> (text also published by Wyoming State Historic Preservation Office here) and </</ref>
Wyoming Home & Hospital for the Aged (1948), Thermopolis, Wyoming
Wyoming State Insane Asylum (1948), 831 Highway 150 South, Evanston, Wyoming (four buildings dating to 1948 attributed to Goodrich & Wilking; six large dormitories date from 1907-1935 are attributed to William Dubois)
Odd Fellows Building (1952), 136 S. Wolcott Street, Casper, Wyoming (Goodrich & Wilking), NRHP-listed
Casper Air Terminal (1955), Casper, Wyoming
Sheridan Community College (1958), now known as Sheridan College, 3059 Coffeen Avenue, Sheridan, Wyoming
Casper Junior College (1959), also known as Casper College, 125 College Drive, Casper, Wyoming (works include dormitories designed by Goodrich & Wilking)
Burlington High School, Burlington, Wyoming, considered to be "one of the few Moderne-style institutional buildings in Wyoming."
Casper National Guard Armory, 900 Werner Court, Casper, Wyoming (Leon Goodrich)
Natrona County Courthouse, Casper, Wyoming (Goodrich & Krusmark)
North Casper Clubhouse, 1002 East "L" Street, Casper, Wyoming (Goodrich & Krusmark), NRHP-listed
Ziettermeister Building, Casper, Wyoming (Goodrich & Krusmark)

References

19th-century American architects
Architects from Wyoming
People from Casper, Wyoming
1892 births
1968 deaths
20th-century American architects
People from Fort Collins, Colorado